Gessner Peak ( is, at , the highest peak of Storkvarvet Mountain, standing  north of Habermehl Peak in the northeast part of the Mühlig-Hofmann Mountains of Queen Maud Land, Antarctica. It was discovered by the Third German Antarctic Expedition (1938–1939), led by Captain Alfred Ritscher, and named for the manager of the German Hansa-Luftbild, an aerial photographic corporation.

See also
 List of mountains of Queen Maud Land

References

External links
 Scientific Committee on Antarctic Research (SCAR)

Mountains of Queen Maud Land
Princess Astrid Coast